The Mungyeong Massacre (Hanja: 聞慶良民虐殺事件) was a massacre conducted by 2nd and 3rd
platoon, 7th company, 3rd battalion, 25th Infantry Regiment, 3rd Infantry Division of the South Korean Army on 24 December 1949 of 86 to 88 unarmed citizens in Mungyeong, North Gyeongsang district of South Korea, all of whom were civilians and a majority of whom were children and elderly people. The victims included 32 children. The victims were massacred because they were suspected communist supporters or collaborators. However, the South Korean government blamed the crime on communist guerrillas for decades.

On 26 June 2006, the Truth and Reconciliation Commission of South Korea concluded that the massacre was committed by the South Korean Army. However, a South Korean local court decided that charging the South Korean government with the massacre was barred by statute of limitations, as the five-year prescription ended in December 1954. On 10 February 2009, the South Korean high court also dismissed the victim's family complaint. In June 2011, the Supreme Court of Korea decided that the South Korean government should compensate victims of the inhumane crimes it had committed regardless of the deadline to make the claim.

See also
Truth and Reconciliation Commission (South Korea)
Bodo League massacre
Jeju Uprising
List of massacres in South Korea

References

External links
 국가범죄 '문경학살사건' 항소심서도 패소 판결 CBS 2009-08-06

Massacres in South Korea
Political repression in South Korea
Massacres committed by South Korea
History of North Gyeongsang Province
Political and cultural purges
Military scandals
1949 in South Korea
Massacres in 1949
First Republic of Korea
Anti-communism in South Korea
December 1949 events in Asia
1949 murders in South Korea